The 1967 Rhode Island Rams football team was an American football team that represented the University of Rhode Island as a member of the Yankee Conference during the 1967 NCAA College Division football season. In its fifth season under head coach Jack Zilly, the team compiled a 6–2–1 record (2–2–1 against conference opponents), finished in third place out of six teams in the Yankee Conference, and outscored opponents by a total of 163 to 110. The team played its home games at Meade Stadium in Kingston, Rhode Island.

Schedule

References

Rhode Island
Rhode Island Rams football seasons
Rhode Island Rams football